Maria Feodorovna was the name taken by two distinct Russian empresses of originally German and Danish ethnicity:
Maria Feodorovna (Sophie Dorothea of Württemberg) (1759–1828), daughter of Frederick II Eugene, Duke of Württemberg; wife of Emperor Paul I of Russia
Maria Feodorovna (Dagmar of Denmark) (1847–1928), daughter of King Christian IX of Denmark; wife of Emperor Alexander III of Russia; mother of Emperor Nicholas II of Russia

See also
The following women have name Maria, patronymic Feodorovna or similar, and also, unlike the above empresses, a surname:
 Maria Feodorovna Pozharskaya  (died 1607), a Russian lady-in-waiting and favorite of tsarina Maria Skuratova-Belskaya.
 Maria Feodorovna Morozova (1830–1911), a Russian entrepreneur
 Maria Fjodorovna Zibold (1849–1939), a Russian and Serbian physician
 Maria Fedorovna Andreeva née Yurkovskaya (1868–1953), a Russian actress and Bolshevik administrator